Fabiano Duarte Cibi (born 22 March 2005) is a Romanian professional footballer who plays as a defensive midfielder for Liga I club UTA Arad.

Club career

UTA Arad

He made his Liga I debut for UTA Arad against Academica Clinceni on 11 March 2022.

Career statistics

Club

References

External links
 
 

2005 births
Living people
People from Santarém, Portugal
Sportspeople from Santarém District
Sportspeople from Timișoara
Portuguese people of Romanian descent
Romanian emigrants to Portugal
Romanian footballers
Romania youth international footballers
Association football midfielders
Liga I players
FC UTA Arad players